Theerawekin Seehawong, alternatively spelt as Theerawesin Seehawong, is a Thai retired footballer and football coach, He is the currently club director & interim head coach Thai League club Nongbua Pitchaya.

Seehawong played for Gombak United between 2006 and 2009 and won the Singapore League Cup with the Bulls in 2008, which was incidentally Gombak United's first piece of silverware.

Club career statistics

Theerawekin Seehawong's Profile

Records start from 2009 to the present. All numbers encased in brackets signify substitute appearances.

Managerial statistics

Honours

 Singapore League Cup 2008 – Champions

References

External links
Profile at Thaipremierleague.co.th

	

1980 births
Living people
Theerawekin Seehawong
Theerawekin Seehawong
Association football midfielders
Theerawekin Seehawong
Theerawekin Seehawong
Gombak United FC players
Woodlands Wellington FC players
Singapore Premier League players
Expatriate footballers in Singapore
Theerawekin Seehawong
Theerawekin Seehawong
Thai expatriate sportspeople in Singapore
Theerawekin Seehawong
Theerawekin Seehawong

ar:تيراسيل دانغدا